James Edward Hopps Jr. (born 1939) is an American jazz drummer. Although he never recorded as a leader, he worked extensively with Roland Kirk, Charles Tolliver, Stanley Cowell, and Pharoah Sanders during some of their well known sessions. He also worked with Sahib Shihab, Joe Bonner, Cecil McBee, Marion Brown, Shirley Scott, Jan Garbarek, and Arild Andersen.

Kazumi Watanabe's Mudari - Spirit Of Song features Hopps as a co-leader. He also appeared on A Song for the Sun, the Sun Ra Arkestra under the direction of Marshall Allen. Here he used his pseudonym Jimmi EsSpirit.

Discography

As sideman
With Stanley Cowell
 Blues for the Viet Cong (Polydor, 1969)
 Illusion Suite (ECM, 1973)
 Handscapes 2 with The Piano Choir (Strata-East, 1975) 

With Roland Kirk
 The Inflated Tear (Atlantic, 1968)
 Left & Right (Atlantic, 1969)
 Roland Kirk (Atlantic, 1969)
 Volunteered Slavery (Atlantic, 1969)

With Charles Tolliver
 The Ringer (Polydor, 1969)
 Music Inc. (Strata-East, 1971)
 Live at Slugs' (Strata-East, 1972)

With others
 Joe Bonner, Angel Eyes (Muse, 1976)
 Marion Brown, Vista (ABC Impulse!, 1975)
 Wild Bill Davis, Free, Frantic and Funky (RCA Victor, 1965)
 Wild Bill Davis, Up Top (RCA Victor, 1979)
 Fumio Karashima, Piranha (Whynot/Trio, 1976)
 Webster Lewis, Live at Club 7 (Sonet, 1972)
 Cecil McBee, Mutima (Strata-East, 1974)
 Pharoah Sanders, Village of the Pharoahs (ABC Impulse!, 1973)
 Pharoah Sanders, Elevation (Impulse!, 1974)
 Shirley Scott, One for Me (Strata-East, 1974)
 Sahib Shihab, Sentiments (Storyville, 1972)
 Harold Vick, Don't Look Back (Strata-East, 1974)

References

External links
Extensive biography
 

American jazz drummers
1939 births
Living people
20th-century American drummers
American male drummers
American male jazz musicians